The 2018 Coupe du Président de la République is the 7th edition of the Coupe du Président de la République (excluding earlier cup competitions), the knockout football competition of Burundi.

Preliminary round
[Jan 26]

Gitaza Star              3-1 Santos FC

First round
[Feb 2]

Kayanza United           4-0 New Force

Kiganda City            1-12 Vital'ô                  

Les Éléphants            2-2 New Oil FC               [3-4 pen]

Rumonge City             3-0 Kalifumu FC

Bujumbura City           4-0 Mangara Young Boys

Messager Bujumbura       0-1 LLB S4A                  

Flambeau de l'Est        1-1 Moso Sugar               [6-5 pen] 

Les Crocos               1-1 Etoile du Nord           [5-4 pen] 

Les Jeunes Athlétiques   2-3 Lumière de Mwumba

Inter Star               4-2 Top Junior

[Feb 3]

Ruyigi City              1-3 Athletico Olympic

Bumamuru                 1-0 Magara Star

Musongati FC             3-0 Ngozi City

Busoni Star              1-0 Les Envoyés

Volontaires              1-0 Commerçants de Ngozi

Burundi Sport Dynamik   11-0 Lumière de Moso

Panthère Cancuzo         0-0 Butare City              [3-1 pen]

Muramvya City            3-1 JC Regina Mundi

Aigle Noir Kigwena       1-5 Les Lierres

Club Kiremba Bururi      5-1 Intaramvya FC Kinyinya

[Feb 4]

Pigeon du Centre         3-0 Butaganzwa FC de Ruyigi

Transport FC             8-0 Bweru FC

Muzinga FC               2-0 Mapenzi FC

Unité FC                 1-2 Rukinzo FC     

Santé FC de Ngozi        0-0 Espoir de Gatumba        [5-4 pen]

Rusizi FC                1-2 Delta Star

Flambeau du Centre       2-5 Aigle Noir Makamba

Agakura FC de Mwaro     0-22 Messager Ngozi

Freedom de Ruyigi        1-0 Gatete FC

Malaika FC               3-2 Bioénergie FC

Olympic Star de Muyinga  4-0 Gitaza Star

Second round
[Mar 2]

Kayanza United           0-2 Vital'ô                  

Volontaires              0-1 Burundi Sport Dynamik

Lumière de Mwumba        0-1 Inter Star    

Flambeau de l'Est        4-1 Les Crocos 

Athletico Olympic        4-0 Bumamuru

[Mar 3]

Musongati FC             3-1 Busoni Star

Transport FC             0-1 Muzinga FC

Club Kiremba Bururi      1-2 Pigeon du Centre         [later awarded to Kiremba]

Malaika                  0-8 Olympic Star

Panthère                 0-0 Muramvya City            [0-3 pen]

[Mar 4]

Club Matana              0-2 Delta Star 

Aigle Noir Makamba       1-1 Les Lierres              [5-4 pen]

Rukinzo FC               1-2 Santé FC de Ngozi

Messager Ngozi          11-0 Freedom de Gisuru 

New Oli FC               0-1 Rumonge City 

Bujumbura City           0-2 LLB S4A

Round of 16
[May 1]

Aigle Noir Makamba       4-1 Inter Star

Rumonge City             0-0 Vital'ô                  [2-4 pen]

LLB S4A                  2-0 Flambeau de l'Est

Delta Star               5-2 Santé FC de Ngozi             

[May 2]

Athletico Olympic        1-2 Musongati FC

Club Kiremba Bururi      0-1 Muzinga FC

Burundi Sport Dynamik    5-1 Muramvya City

Messager Ngozi           0-1 Olympic Star

Quarter-finals
[May 29]

Vital'ô                  0-0 LLB S4A                  [aet, 3-1 pen]

Musongati FC             0-2 Burundi Sport Dynamik    

[May 30]

Muzinga FC               0-2 Delta Star               

Aigle Noir Makamba       0-1 Olympic Star de Muyinga

Semi-finals
[Jun 2]

Vital'ô                  2-1 Burundi Sport Dynamik    

[Jun 3]

Delta Star               4-0 Olympic Star de Muyinga

Final
[Jun 23, Gitega]

Vital'ô                  3-1 Delta Star

See also
2017–18 Burundi Premier League

References

Burundi
Cup
Football competitions in Burundi